Smilax lasioneura, the Blue Ridge carrionflower, is a North American species of flowering plants in the greenbriar family. It is widespread across central Canada and the central United States, from Ontario, Manitoba and Saskatchewan south to Texas, Louisiana, and Florida.

Smilax lasioneura is an erect, branching herb up to 250 cm (5 feet) tall. Flowers are small but numerous, in umbels of many flowers. Berries are round, blue to almost black.

References

External links
Illinois Wildflowers
Lady Bird Johnson Wildflower Center, University of Texas
Climbers, Censusing Lianas In Mesic Biomes of Eastern RegionS  A project of Robyn J. Burnham, University of Michigan
Ontario Wildflowers
Illinois Natural History Survey

Smilacaceae
Flora of North America
Plants described in 1838